Nolay may refer to:

Places

France
 Nolay, Côte-d'Or
 Nolay, Nièvre

Spain:
 Nolay, Soria, a municipality in Spain

People

 NoLay, British rap artist/singer and songwriter.